Graham Newberry (born June 7, 1998) is a British figure skater. He has won eight senior international medals, including gold at the 2017 Merano Cup, and is a four-time British national champion. He has reached the final segment at seven ISU Championships.

Personal life
Graham Newberry was born June 7, 1998, in Hershey, Pennsylvania. He has dual British and American citizenship. He is the son of Christian Newberry, the 1989 British senior champion, and brother of Jack Newberry, the 2012 British junior bronze medalist.

Career
Newberry competed on the novice level in the 2011–12 season and moved up to the junior level the following season. At the 2013 European Youth Olympic Festival, he placed third in both segments but came in fourth overall.

In the 2013–14 season, Newberry received his first ISU Junior Grand Prix (JGP) assignments; he placed tenth in Mexico City and fifth in Ostrava. After winning the British junior title, he was sent to the 2014 World Junior Championships, where he qualified for the free skate. Ranked 21st in the short and 17th in the free, he finished 19th overall at the competition in Sofia, Bulgaria. Coached by his father, he trained at Twin Ponds in Harrisburg, Pennsylvania until the end of the season.

In mid-2014, Newberry began training in London, England, where he continued to be coached by his father. In his second JGP season, he placed seventh in Ostrava and sixth in Zagreb. Making his senior international debut, he finished eighth at the Volvo Open Cup, an ISU Challenger Series in November 2014. In February 2015, he won the senior silver medal at the Jegvirag Cup in Hungary. At the 2015 World Junior Championships in Tallinn, he placed 23rd in the short, 20th in the free, and 21st overall.

In December 2016, Newberry won the British senior title, outscoring silver medalist Peter James Hallam by 1.4 points and defending champion Phillip Harris by 8.23 points. He also won his third junior national title.

Programs

Competitive highlights 
GP: Grand Prix; CS: Challenger Series; JGP: Junior Grand Prix

References

External links 
 

1998 births
American emigrants to England
British male single skaters
Living people
People from Dauphin County, Pennsylvania